Victoria Island is an island in the Ottawa River, located north of LeBreton Flats, 1 km west of Parliament Hill in Ottawa, Ontario, Canada. The island is "a place of special significance" to the local Algonquian peoples, who use the island for ceremonial purposes and for protests. It is part of an archipelago of islands below Chaudière Falls, which also includes the former Philemon Island, Chaudière Island, Amelia Island and Albert Island.

Both the Portage Bridge and Chaudière Bridge cross the island, connecting Ottawa to Gatineau, Quebec on the other side of the river. Otherwise, public access to the island is currently restricted due to an environmental remediation project set to be completed in 2025. The project is projected to cost $13 million.

History
Indigenous people were inhabiting the area up to 9,000 years ago, using the island to portage and for trade. The nearby Chaudière Falls was used for ceremonial purposes, meetings, and as a burial site. Beginning in the 19th century, the island was used for mixed industrial, commercial and residential uses, and was home to a sawmill, and ironwork and manufacturing companies. The Wilson Carbide Mill, named for Thomas Willson, the inventor of the process to produce calcium carbide and acetylene gas, was built on the island in 1900. The mill, a four storey stone building, manufactured calcium carbide. It has been recognized as a Federal Heritage Building. Industrial use of the island has contaminated the land, resulting in the current clean up operation. This contamination was revealed through soil samples taken in 2017, revealing that the island's soil, groundwater and surface water were contaminated with ashes, lead, zinc and fuel oil. The National Capital Commission (NCC) acquired most of the island in the 1960s, with the remainder being acquired in 2018 from Public Services and Procurement Canada.

Protests
The island has a long history of Indigenous protests. In 1974, a group of protesters known as "The Native People's Caravan" occupied the Carbide Mill, while in 1995 Aboriginal Defence League protesters broke into the mill and set up an "Aboriginal Embassy". In 1988, Algonquins of Barriere Lake set up tents on the island to protest "the ravaging of their land by the federal and Quebec governments". They returned in 1990, partly in solidarity of the Mohawk people in the Oka Crisis. In 2013, Attawapiskat First Nation chief Theresa Spence took up residence on the island to protest against the Government of Canada.

Future
Following the completion of the remediation project, the NCC plans to work with the Algonquin Anishinaabe Nation to develop a master plan for the island and to re-open it to the public.

References

Algonquin
First Nations history in Ontario
Ottawa River
Landforms of Ottawa
Uninhabited islands of Ontario
River islands of Ontario